Bedevilled is a 1955 American crime drama film directed by Mitchell Leisen and starring Anne Baxter, Steve Forrest and Simone Renant.

Plot
Gregory Fitzgerald and his friend Tony are leaving New York to fly to France, where they will study for the priesthood. On the plane, French fashion designer Francesca flirts with the handsome Greg, unaware of his vocation, and gives him her phone number.

Greg goes to see Father du Rochet, leaving behind Tony, who is feeling ill from the flight. He ends up sharing a taxi with an American woman named Monica Johnson, who drops a St. Christopher's medal. He picks it up and follows her into a club, where it turns out Monica is a singer.

In her dressing room, Greg arrives just as three French policemen are questioning her. He speaks the language and is shocked to hear Monica using him as an alibi. Monica panics and runs into an alley, where Greg fights off a man who tries to grab her. Monica goes to her hotel to pack a suitcase, but flees from three men who knock Greg cold.

Tony is concerned by Greg's disappearance and even calls Francesca, wondering if she's heard from him. Greg wakes up and is told by the concierge that Monica has been in touch. He goes to Napoleon's tomb to meet her. Monica says she witnessed the murder of a man and is now being pursued by men who work for the criminal responsible, Trevelle.

As they find a place to hide, Monica makes a romantic advance toward Greg, who resists. She later learns from Tony that they are in France to join a seminary.

Francesca is willing to help, and she takes Greg to meet Trevelle. The story he is told is that the murdered man was Trevelle's brother, Michael, who had been romantically involved with the American woman. At a church where Du Rochet is saying Mass, a confrontation turns up the truth, Monica's admission that she shot Michael when he tried to break up with her. She leaves and is shot in the street, where Greg assists her in reciting the Act of Contrition in which she expresses sorrow for her sins and is a sign that she is saved from eternal damnation.

Cast
 Anne Baxter as Monica Johnson
 Steve Forrest as Gregory Fitzgerald
 Simone Renant as Francesca
 Maurice Teynac as Trevelle
Robert Christopher as Tony Lugacetti
 Joseph Tomelty as Father Cunningham
 Victor Francen as Father Du Rocher
 Raymond Bussières as Concierge
 Jacques Hilling as Taxi Driver
 Olivier Hussenot as Remy Hotel Manager

Reception
According to MGM records the film earned $525,000 in the US and Canada and $522,000 elsewhere resulting in a loss of $518,000.

See also
List of American films of 1955

References

External links
 
 
 

1955 films
Films set in Paris
Films directed by Mitchell Leisen
Metro-Goldwyn-Mayer films
CinemaScope films
Films scored by William Alwyn
American crime drama films
1950s English-language films
1950s American films
1955 crime drama films